Maritime domain awareness (MDA) is defined by the International Maritime Organization as the effective understanding of anything associated with the maritime domain that could impact the security, safety, economy, or environment.  
MDA is said to work as a ‘key enabler’ for other maritime security issues, such as anti-piracy patrols, in the way that in order to do effective patrols you need to have the ability of conducting effective MDA. The maritime domain is defined as all areas and things of, on, under, relating to, adjacent to, or bordering on a sea, ocean, or other navigable waterway, including all maritime-related activities, infrastructure, people, cargo, and vessels and other conveyances.

Countries have always gathered information about the maritime environment, in order to collect intelligence necessary for various missions or finding enemy navies. Modern MDA however, was defined in the aftermath of the 9/11 terror attack and the terror attack on the destroyer USS Cole. Maritime Domain Awareness programs aims to detect threats and come up with resolutions to these; helping with decision-making for different threats and; inspects that international law are kept, in order to ensure freedom of navigation.

Different agents conducts MDA, the most important being Maritime Domain Awareness Centers or Maritime Domain Awareness Fusion Centers. Maritime Domain Awareness Centers can have different areas of studies, regional, crime, military threats etc. These centers gather the information, fuse it together and analyze the data in order to spot trends and patterns. The data gathered is useful for different things such as; law enforcement, governance and capacity building.

Automatic Identification System (AIS) is one of the most important sources of data for the MDA agencies. AIS is used in order for ships to know each other’s whereabouts, they transmit a signal from ship to ship and to shore. Lately, the system has been developed into satellite system, so called satellite AIS, which makes the system more effective. All ocean-going vessels above 300 tons, are supposed to use and transmit via AIS according to the International Maritime Organisation (Cudzilo et al., 2012: 1).

Underwater domain awareness (UDA) is the aspect of maritime domain awareness focused on the underwater sector. There is a military requirement, but also a need to monitor undersea geophysical activity which can provide vital clues to minimize the impact of devastating natural disasters.

Canada
In Canada, the 2004 National Security Policy resulted in the establishment of Marine Security Operations Centers (MSOCs) responsible for supporting a national response to maritime security threat. The East Coast MSOC is in Halifax, the West Coast MSOC is in Victoria, and the Great Lakes and St. Lawrence Seaway MSOC is in Niagara.

European Union
The European Union took a decision in 2008 to improve the integration and interoperability of member states' maritime safety, security, border control, environmental protection, fisheries and law enforcement systems in order to create a Common Information Sharing Environment for the EU maritime domain.

Denmark 
The Royal Danish Navy is the main agent in the Kingdom of Denmark, which conducts MDA. The National Maritime Operational Center, belongs under “søværnet” and has different tasks to perform, such as search and rescue (SAR) and Maritime Traffic control in the territorial waters.

In Greenland the Danish navy is building up its capabilities over the coming years, in 2021 the Mette Frederiksen Government together with Venstre, Danish Peoples’s Party, Danish Social Liberal Party, Conservative Peoples’s Party and Liberal Alliance, increased the budget with further 1.5 billion DKK. These new capabilities includes drones, education, analyst center, satellite surveillance and radar systems. The purpose is to give the navy better capabilities to support the civil society in SAR missions, environment surveillance, fishery control, research etc. The agreement also accommodates wishes from NATO, that Denmark should acquire long range drones for surveillance of the ocean.

India

The Modi led BJP Govt had promised to set up a National Maritime Authority (NMA) of India in their 2014 election manifesto to ensure cohesive policy-making and effective coordination on coastal security among the multiple authorities dealing with maritime issues in the country. But the proposal for the same is yet to see daylight. However post 26/11 a slew of coastal security measures have been taken, from a fledgling coastal radar network to state marine police stations and NMA. The 15 or more agencies involved, ranging from Navy, Coast Guard, customs, intelligence agencies and port authorities to the home and shipping ministries, state governments and fisheries departments, often work at cross-purposes. A full-time federal body like NMA is needed to clear the clutter. The National Maritime Domain Awareness (NMDA) Project of India, an integrated intelligence grid to detect and tackle threats emanating from the sea in real-time has been established to generate a common operational picture of activities at sea through an institutionalised mechanism for collecting, fusing and analysing information from technical and other sources like coastal surveillance network radars, space-based automatic identification systems, vessel traffic management systems, fishing vessel registration and fishermen biometric identity databases.

India has a coastal surveillance radar systems (CSRS) network with radar across India, Seychelles and Mauritius and Sri Lanka. As of January 2019, India is in advanced discussions with Myanmar to install similar radar systems there, and has also offered these systems to Bangladesh, Indonesia, Thailand and Maldives.

Philippines
In the Philippines, the National Coast Watch System (NCWS) was originally designed to improve maritime domain awareness in the Sulu and Celebes Seas, but has been extended over the entire island country's territory.

South Africa
In March 2012, the South African Navy announce the establishment of two MDA centers, one in Cape Town for the west coast and one in Durban to cover the east coast.

United States
In the United States, the Secretary of the Navy is the DoD Executive Agent for maritime domain awareness.

For private ports, The Mariner Group's CommandBridge platform is the market leader in Maritime Domain Awareness Systems.

See also 
 Maritime power
 Situation awareness military training methods

References

Maritime safety
Law of the sea